is a Japanese singer and songwriter from Saitama, currently signed to Warner Music Japan.

Minami won the second FlyingDog Audition Grand Prix in 2017, and later signed onto FlyingDog under Victor Entertainment in 2019. On June 30, 2020, she transferred to Warner Music Japan.

Biography 
Minami was born in the city of Saitama in Saitama Prefecture.  Influenced by the live performances of Yutaka Ozaki in high school, she took up guitar and participated in music activities.
In 2017, the first mini-album "ETERNAL BLUE" and the first single "main actor" were released. On Tower Records in Shibuya, Sapporo, Sendai, Nagoya, Osaka, Hiroshima, Fukuoka, limited sales were made.

Discography

Mini-Albums/Extended Plays

Singles

Miscellaneous
• アスター (Astor)• ハル-あと3cmの冬-• groping• issue• プレッシャーボーイズ (Pressure Boys)• Deep-sea fish• 放課後オレンジヒーロー (After School Orange Hero)• ETERNAL BLUE• 留年確定• カレーライス (Curry Rice)• サイダーみたいだ (Like a Cider)• 傘を忘れた日• Summer time game!!• 星屑のうた• 雪見だいふくの歌

References

External links
Official site

21st-century Japanese women singers
21st-century Japanese singers
1997 births
Living people
People from Saitama (city)